Altıntepe is a Urartian fortress and temple archaeological site, Turkey .

Altıntepe, Altyntepe, Altyn Tepe, Altyntepe, Altintepe, Altindepe, etc., meaning Golden Hill in Turkic languages, may also refer to:

Populated places in Turkey
, a township and neighborhood (mahalle) in Eyyübiye district,  Şanlıurfa Province, Turkey
, a township and neighborhood in Haliliye district,  Şanlıurfa Province, Turkey
, a neighborhood (mahalle) in Maltepe district, Istanbul, Turkey
, a township and neighborhood in Menderes district,  İzmir Province, Turkey
Altıntepe, Sarayköy,  a village in Sarayköy district,  Denizli Province, Turkey
, a township and neighborhood in Tusba district, Van Province, Turkey
, a township and neighborhood  in  Yakutiye district,  Erzurum Province, Turkey

Other
, an archaeological site in  İzmir Province, Turkey
Altyndepe, a Bronze Age (BMAC) archaeological site in Turkmenistan

See also
Altân Tepe mine, Romania
Altyntobe, Kazakhstan
:kk:Алтынтөбе